The 14th Los Angeles Film Critics Association Awards were announced on 10 December 1988 and given on 24 January 1989.

Winners
Best Picture:
Little Dorrit
Runner-up: Dead Ringers
Best Director:
David Cronenberg – Dead Ringers
Runner-up: Martin Scorsese – The Last Temptation of Christ
Best Actor:
Tom Hanks – Big and Punchline
Runner-up: Gene Hackman – Another Woman, Bat*21, Full Moon in Blue Water, Mississippi Burning and Split Decisions
Best Actress:
Christine Lahti – Running on Empty
Runner-up: Jodie Foster – The Accused and Diane Venora – Bird
Best Supporting Actor:
Alec Guinness – Little Dorrit
Runner-up: Martin Landau – Tucker: The Man and His Dream
Best Supporting Actress:
Geneviève Bujold – Dead Ringers and The Moderns
Runner-up: Miriam Margolyes – Little Dorrit
Best Screenplay:
Ron Shelton – Bull Durham
Runner-up: Alan Rudolph and Jon Bradshaw - The Moderns
Best Cinematography:
Henri Alekan – Wings of Desire (Der Himmel über Berlin)
Best Music Score:
Mark Isham – The Moderns
Best Foreign Film:
Wings of Desire (Der Himmel über Berlin) • West Germany/France
Runner-up: Salaam Bombay! • UK/India/France
Best Non-Fiction Film:
Hôtel Terminus: The Life and Times of Klaus Barbie
Experimental/Independent Film/Video Award:
Derek Jarman – The Last of England
Al Razutis – Amerika 
New Generation Award:
Mira Nair – Salaam Bombay!
Career Achievement Award:
Don Siegel
Special Citation:
Who Framed Roger Rabbit

References

External links
14th Annual Los Angeles Film Critics Association Awards

1988
Los Angeles Film Critics Association Awards
Los Angeles Film Critics Association Awards
Los Angeles Film Critics Association Awards
Los Angeles Film Critics Association Awards